Zhaina Shekerbekova (born 17 December 1989) is a Kazakh female boxer.

She represented Kazakhstan at the 2016 Summer Olympics in Rio de Janeiro, in the women's flyweight.

She won a silver medal at the 2014 Asian Games, and a bronze medal at the 2016 AIBA Women's World Boxing Championships.

References

1989 births
Living people
Kazakhstani women boxers
Olympic boxers of Kazakhstan
Boxers at the 2016 Summer Olympics
AIBA Women's World Boxing Championships medalists
Asian Games silver medalists for Kazakhstan
Medalists at the 2014 Asian Games
Asian Games medalists in boxing
Boxers at the 2010 Asian Games
Boxers at the 2014 Asian Games
Flyweight boxers
21st-century Kazakhstani women